Dylan Samuel Horton (born August 21, 2000) is an American football defensive end who currently plays for the TCU Horned Frogs. He previously played for the New Mexico Lobos.

Early life and high school
Horton grew up in Frisco, Texas and attended Frisco High School, where he played safety on the football team. He initially committed to play college football at SMU. Horton flipped his commitment to New Mexico during his senior year following the departure of SMU head coach Chad Morris.

College career
Horton began his college career playing for the New Mexico Lobos. The New Mexico coaching staff moved him from safety to outside linebacker. Horton played in 17 games over the course of two season. Following the end of the season he entered the NCAA transfer portal.

Horton ultimately transferred to TCU. He was granted waiver to play immediately by the NCAA. Horton was moved from linebacker to defensive end in his first season playing for the Horned Frogs. He became a starter in 2021 and led the team with nine tackles for loss and tied for the team lead with four sacks. Horton was named honorable mention All-Big 12 Conference as a senior. He had four sacks, a forced fumble, and broke up a pass in TCU's 51-45 win over Michigan in the 2022 Fiesta Bowl.

References

External links
New Mexico Lobos bio
TCU Horned Frogs bio

Living people
American football defensive ends
Players of American football from Texas
TCU Horned Frogs football players
New Mexico Lobos football players
Year of birth missing (living people)